Lachnella is a genus of cyphelloid fungi in the Niaceae family. The genus has a widespread distribution and contains six species.

The tiny fruiting bodies (up to about 2 mm across) are cup-shaped or disc-shaped and are densely edged with long white hairs.  At most they may have a very short stem, but generally none at all.  They can be found all year round on sticks, stalks and sometimes on bark.  They are resistant to desiccation, rolling up into a tough closed ball to protect the fertile surface when dry weather comes.

References

External links

Niaceae
Agaricales genera
Taxa named by Elias Magnus Fries